"The Needle and the Damage Done" is a 1972 song by Canadian-American singer-songwriter Neil Young. The lyrics describe the effects of heroin addiction on musicians Young knew, including his friend and Crazy Horse bandmate Danny Whitten, who would die of an overdose the same year the song was released. The song would preview the theme of Young's 1975 album Tonight's the Night, which would reflect on the fatal heroin overdoses of Whitten and Bruce Berry, a roadie for Young and Crazy Horse.

Young version 
"The Needle and the Damage Done" was first released on Young's 1972 album Harvest. Rather than re-recording it, Young selected a live version from January 1971 that featured him singing and playing acoustic guitar. It would appear on the compilation albums Decade in 1977 and Greatest Hits in 2004. On the handwritten liner notes for Decade, Young wrote of the song: "I am not a preacher, but drugs killed a lot of great men."

Young performed the song in a 2005 Nashville concert, with the version being included on Jonathan Demme's 2006 documentary Neil Young: Heart of Gold. The documentary's DVD includes Young's 1971 performance of the song from The Johnny Cash Show.

The song also appears on the 2007 album Live at Massey Hall 1971. 

At the January 19, 1971 concert featured on the live album, Young presented "The Needle and the Damage Done" with the following introduction:
Ever since I left Canada about five years ago or so and moved down south, I found out a lot of things that I didn't know when I left. Some of 'em are good, and some of 'em are bad. Got to see a lot of great musicians before they happened, before they became famous, y'know, when they were just gigging, five and six sets a night... things like that. And I got to see a lot of great musicians who nobody ever got to see for one reason or another. But, strangely enough, the real good ones that you never got to see was... 'cause of heroin.  And that started happening over and over. Then it happened to someone that everyone knew about. So I just wrote a little song.

Cover versions
Bands that have covered this song on studio albums include Our Lady Peace, Green River, Duran Duran, Lior, Simple Minds, and The Pretenders; Punk rock band The Bronx recorded a cover which can be found as a b-side on the "False Alarm" single.

Red Hot Chili Peppers bassist Flea has covered it while on tour in 1993 for the temporary departure of John Frusciante from their band.

Five Eight covered the song for their 1993 release The Angriest Man.

Tori Amos covered the song during her "Strange Little Tour" in 2001.

Cross Canadian Ragweed's Cody Canada performed the song acoustically on their 2006 release Back to Tulsa - Live and Loud at Cain's Ballroom.

Alternative metal band Seether covered it during a performance on Last Call with Carson Daly.

Ashley Cleveland covers this song on her 2002 album Second Skin.

Australian singer Lior covered the song in 2006 as part of youth radio station Triple J's Like a Version segment.

Irish singer Andrea Corr covered it during her AOL Sessions on July 19, 2007 in support of her solo album Ten Feet High.

English folk singer Laura Marling covered it twice on her August 2008 tour of Australia, and on several dates during her 2010 tour of England, Marling has since recorded the cover on a limited edition 7" distributed as a part of the Third Man Records Blue Series.

English singer Pete Doherty covered it during a gig at the French festival Eurockéennes de Belfort in 2009 and at the Roskilde Festival in Denmark in July 2009 as well as at the Belgian festival Lokerse Feesten in August 2009.

Pearl Jam's lead singer Eddie Vedder covered the song at a Pearl Jam show on August 23, 2009, at the United Center in Chicago, Illinois.  He dedicated it to Michael Jackson, to whom he grew up listening. Pearl Jam also covered the song during their Backspacer tour.

Dave Matthews covered the song frequently in his live performances during 2010, including a tribute concert for Young, when he was honored as the MusiCares Person of the Year (also in 2010).

Jewel covered the song on The Howard Stern Show on May 24, 2010.

Marcy Playground covered the song on their 2012 album, Lunch, Recess & Detention.

Grindcore band Cloud Rat covered the song on their 2013 Moksha.

Gregg Allman and Warren Haynes covered the song the first night of the 2013 Warren Haynes Christmas Jam, as well as in the second night of same year's Crossroads Guitar Festival.

Jake Bugg recorded an acoustic cover of the song in late 2013.

References in popular culture
 The song was the inspiration for The Sisters of Mercy's first 7" single, "The Damage Done" (1980).
 The title was also used as the album title for the second installment of the Nirvana Outcesticide bootleg series (1995).
 In the ninth episode of the second season of NewsRadio Jimmy remarks to Dave that he's "...seen the coffee and the damage done," a reference to Dave's coffee addiction.
 Rolling Stone'''s cover story on Alice in Chains frontman Layne Staley, a known heroin addict, bears the title (Issue 727).
 A reference to its title can be found in the song "Understanding in a Car Crash" on the album Full Collapse (2001) by Thursday.
 A fourth-season episode of Homicide: Life on the Street concerning the fallout from a drug war was titled "The Damage Done."
 "Song to Say Goodbye" from the Placebo album Meds (2006) includes the lyrical reference "your needle and your damage done."
 In 1994, several prison guards in Idaho were accused of playing this song to taunt death-row inmates during a scheduled lethal injection.
 A reference to the title appears in the song "Genetic Design For Dying" from Aiden's album Nightmare Anatomy (2005).
 In 1997, the Skylab remix of the Depeche Mode song "Home" was titled "Home (The Noodles & The Damage Done)."
 In a 2012 episode of New Girl (TV Series), "Bully,"  Max Greenfield's character Schmidt references the song, saying "Schmiddle and the damage done. Yo Neil Young." to his lover.
 A 2002 episode of Will & Grace is titled "The Needle and the Omelet's Done," in reference to the title of this song.
 British Artist Pete Fowler's August 2013 solo exhibition, at Beach London Gallery, of cross-stich embroidery was titled "The Needle and The Damage Done."
 The title of this song was used by former Heroes del Silencio singer Enrique Bunbury in his 2009 album Las Consecuencias in the song "Los Habitantes."
A horror novel called MILK-BLOOD'', based on this song's lyrics, was published in June 2014.

References

Neil Young songs
1972 songs
Protest songs
Road crew
Songs written by Neil Young
Songs about death
Songs about heroin
Songs about drugs
Song recordings produced by Neil Young